Judge Porter may refer to:

David J. Porter (judge) (born 1966), judge of the United States Court of Appeals for the Third Circuit
David Stewart Porter (1909–1989), judge of the United States District Court for the Southern District of Ohio
Donald James Porter (1921–2003), judge of the United States District Court for the District of South Dakota
Robert William Porter (1926–1991), judge of the United States District Court for the Northern District of Texas

See also
Justice Porter (disambiguation)